Kemie (also known as Tohmajärvi) is a village and administrative center of the Tohmajärvi municipality in North Karelia, Finland. At the end of 2020, the village had 1,445 inhabitants. It is located along the Highway 9, and like several North Karelian human settlements, Kemie has developed on top of a large, forested hill called vaara.

History 
Kemie was first mentioned in 1618. The village name is derived from the nearby hill Kemienmäki, locally Kemmiimmäki, meaning "hill of meadows" (kemien is the plural genitive form of a dialectal word kemi). The name of Selkie in Kontiolahti has been formed similarly.

References

External links
 Kemie's location at Fonecta

Tohmajärvi
Villages in Finland